Pa Sak is a tambon (subdistrict) of Chiang Saen District, in Chiang Rai Province, Thailand. In 2019 it had a total population of 7,877 people.

History
The subdistrict was created effective September 15, 1979 by splitting off 9 administrative villages from Si Don Mun.

Administration

Central administration
The tambon is subdivided into 13 administrative villages (muban).

Local administration
The whole area of the subdistrict is covered by the subdistrict administrative organization (SAO) Pa Sak (องค์การบริหารส่วนตำบลป่าสัก).

Landmarks 
The historical site of Wat Pa Sak is located in this region.

References

External links
Thaitambon.com on Pa Sak

Tambon of Chiang Rai province
Populated places in Chiang Rai province